Under Influence was the only album of new wave band Zones, released by Arista Records on June 1, 1979. The album contained multi-genred songs, being very far from the early punkier stuff, like in the case of 7" single "Stuck with You". Jim Green in Trousser Press distinguished or tried to define it as "pop? Hard stuff? Commercial new wave? Reggae-pop?".

Although the album has new wave sounds, it was unsuccessful at the time of its release. Shortly afterwards, Zones released a 7" single called "Mourning Star", whose eponymous song (a shorter version of the album song) was backed with "Under Influence", which did not appear in the album, despite the name being the same. At the end of 1979, and after years of failures, the group split up.

Track listing

Original LP (1981)

Personnel
 Willie Gardner - lead vocals, guitar
 Billy McIsaac - keyboards, vocals
 Russell Webb - bass, vocals
 Kenny Hyslop - drums, percussion

References

External links
 Album on Discogs

1979 debut albums
Zones (band) albums
Arista Records albums
Albums produced by Tim Friese-Greene